Cornelius  O'Brien (May 8, 1898 – December 1, 1993) was a professional football player. He played in the National Football League in 1921 with the New York Brickley Giants and in first American Football League with the Boston Bulldogs in 1926.

An immigrant from Ireland, O'Brien grew up in Boston and later played college football at Boston College before signing to the NFL.

Notes

1898 births
1993 deaths
Players of American football from Boston
Irish players of American football
Boston Bulldogs (AFL) players
New York Brickley Giants players
Boston College Eagles football players
Irish emigrants to the United States (before 1923)